The House of Schwarzburg was one of the oldest noble families of Thuringia. Upon the death of Prince Friedrich Günther in 1971, a claim to the headship of the house passed under Semi-Salic primogeniture to his elder sister, Princess Marie Antoinette of Schwarzburg who married Friedrich Magnus V, Count of Solms-Wildenfels. Reigning over the County of Schwarzburg and founded by Sizzo I of Schwarzburg (died 1160), the family split in the 16th century into the lines of Schwarzburg-Sondershausen and Schwarzburg-Rudolstadt, with the Sondershausen dying out in 1909.

Family history
The County of Schwarzburg was a state of the Holy Roman Empire from 1195 to 1595, when it was partitioned into Schwarzburg-Rudolstadt and Schwarzburg-Sondershausen. It was ruled by counts from the House of Schwarzburg. Schwarzburg Castle was first mentioned in a 1071 deed. In 1123 Count Sizzo III of Käfernburg (Kevernburg), mentioned by the medieval chronicler Lambert of Hersfeld and according to the Annalista Saxo a grandson of Prince Yaropolk Izyaslavich of Turov by his mother, rebuilt the castle calling himself a "Count of Schwarzburg". Sizzo also established Georgenthal Abbey and in 1157, he accompanied Emperor Frederick I Barbarossa during his campaign against High Duke Bolesław IV the Curly of Poland.

In 1197, Sizzo's grandson Henry II divided the common heritage with his brother Günther III and made Schwarzburg Castle his residence. His territory then also comprised the nearby castle of Blankenburg.

The most famous family member is Günther XXI von Schwarzburg. In 1349, he was elected as German king by the majority of electors. But, due to waning support, he renounced some months later and died shortly after.

The Schwarzburg lands were again divided among his successors until in 1538 when Count Günther XL the Rich was able to unite the territories including Frankenhausen and Rudolstadt under his rule. He was succeeded by his eldest son Günther XLI. However, after his death in 1583, his younger brothers again divided the county: John Günther I received the territory around Arnstadt, later called Schwarzburg-Sondershausen, while Albrecht VII inherited the lands of Schwarzburg-Rudolstadt. The partition was finally confirmed by the 1599 Treaty of Stadtilm.

Counts of Schwarzburg and Käfernburg

House of Schwarzburg

Partitions of Schwarzburg under Schwarzburg rule

Table of rulers
(Note: There are two manners for numbering the rulers of this noble family: birth numbers or regnal numbers. This table uses the regnal numbers for avoiding confusion or holes in the numbering. There's a different numbering for Schwarzburg, Käfernburg (from Günther IIII onwards) and Hallermund (as an already existing county which came into the family by marriage)).

Counts and Princes of Schwarzburg-Sondershausen

 1552–1586: John Günther I
 1586–1631: Günther XLII, with Anton Henry, John Günther II and Christian Günther I
 1631–1638: Günther XLII, with Anton Henry and Christian Günther I
 1638–1642: Günther XLII, with Christian Günther I
 1642–1643: Günther XLII, with Anton Günther I
 1643–1666: Anton Günther I
 1666–1697: Christian William, with Anton Günther II
 1697–1716: Anton Günther II
 1697 – 10 May 1721: Christian William
 10 May 1721 – 28 November 1740: Günther XLIII
 28 November 1740 – 6 November 1758: Henry XXXV
 6 November 1758 – 14 October 1794: Christian Günther III
 14 October 1794 – 19 August 1835: Günther Friedrich Karl I
 19 August 1835 – 17 July 1880: Günther Friedrich Karl II
 17 July 1880 – 28 March 1909: Karl Günther
 28 March 1909 – November 1918: Günther Victor

See also
 Schwarzburg-Rudolstadt
 Schwarzburg-Sondershausen
 List of consorts of Schwarzburg

References

External links
 House Laws of Schwarzburg 

 
Schwarzburg